Lucci is a surname. Notable people with the surname include:

 Antonio Lucci (1682–1752), blessed Italian Franciscan
 Giovanni Luca Lucci (1637–1740), Italian painter
 Giovanni Ulisse Lucci (active 1717–1760s), Italian painter 
 Mike Lucci (1939–2021), American football player
 Settimio Lucci, Italian  professional football  coach
 Susan Lucci (born 1946), American actress on All My Children
 Rob Lucci, a character from the anime and manga series One Piece

Surnames
Italian-language surnames
Latin-language surnames
Patronymic surnames